Tapinella panuoides is a fungus species in the genus Tapinella.

Atromentin is a phenolic compound. The first enzymes in its biosynthesis have been characterised in T. panuoides.

Despite its pleasant taste, the species is poisonous.

References

External links 

Boletales
Fungi described in 1931

Poisonous fungi